Marion Wilson (born October 19, 1956) is an American former heavyweight professional boxer who competed from 1989 to 2007. Wilson, despite having faced some of the hardest punchers of his era, has never been stopped in his professional career. As a result, he is considered by many to have one of the best chins in boxing history, and boxing writer James Slater included him on a list of boxing's best "chins" and Livefight.com ranked him as #8 in terms of best heavyweight chins ever. Wilson faced virtually all notable prospects of his time with perfect records, stopping several promising winning streaks as well as taking former heavyweight champion Ray Mercer to a draw. In the words of the ABC Sports Network's boxing analyst Al Bernstein, Wilson is a veteran fighter, who "has not won many fights, but always gives these youngsters a tough time." He holds wins over Corey Sanders, Mike Hunter, and Paea Wolfgramm.

Amateur career
Wilson took up boxing at the age of 27.

Professional career
Nicknamed "The Creep" and "Jackhammer", Wilson turned professional in 1989 and immediately established himself as a tough journeyman opponent for the heavyweight elite. Despite a lackluster record, he has faced, and has lost decisions to, fighters including Oliver McCall, Samuel Peter, Hasim Rahman, Andrew Golota, Shannon Briggs and Ike Ibeabuchi (the latest caught him on a two-days notice, Ibeabuchi was scheduled to fight Corey Sanders for the Tuesday Night Fights, but Sanders quit a few days prior to the scheduled fight, event promoters in a hurry began to look for a substitute, and Wilson took the chance.) One of his notable victories was against rising, undefeated Thomas Williams, who was Wilson's roommate at the time, and who is best known for being the only fighter to be jailed for fight fixing. Wilson, despite losing 41 fights, was never knocked down, nor received a standing eight count in a bout. Hence, he is considered one of boxing's "best chins". Wilson also defeated boxers such as Mike Hunter, Corey Sanders, and Paea Wolfgramm, while his fight against WBO heavyweight champion Ray Mercer resulted in a draw.

Wilson felt he was "robbed" of his victories in fights against Orlin Norris, and Obed Sullivan, via the judges' decision (holding Don King responsible).

Professional boxing record

References

External links
  (history)
 BoxingRecords

1956 births
Living people
American male boxers
Boxers from South Carolina
Sportspeople from Florence, South Carolina
Heavyweight boxers